The New Zealand men's national tennis team represents New Zealand in Davis Cup tennis competition and are governed by Tennis New Zealand.

New Zealand currently compete in Group II of the Asia/Oceania Zone.  They have played in the World Group on 8 occasions, the most recent of which was in 1991.  They reached the semifinals in 1982.

History
New Zealand competed in its first Davis Cup in 1924.  Prior to 1914, New Zealand competed together with Australia as Australasia. Australasia won the Davis Cup in 1907, 1908, 1909, 1911 and 1914. Anthony Wilding was the only New Zealander to play for Australasia, and he was part of the winning team in 1907, 1908, 1909 and 1914. The final of the 1911 Davis Cup was held in Christchurch from January 1–3, 1912, the first tie to be played in New Zealand. New Zealand was also the host for the finals nine years later, when they were held in Auckland.

New Zealand's best result as a separate team was a World Group semi-final in 1982, which they lost 2–3 to France on clay in Aix-en-Provence. New Zealand had beaten Spain by 3–2 on grass in Christchurch in the first round and Italy by 3–2 on clay in Cervia in the quarter-final. That year the New Zealand team comprised Chris Lewis, Onny Parun, Russell Simpson, and Bruce Derlin.

New Zealand also made in to the World Group quarter-finals in 1981, 1983, and 1990.

Current team (2022) 

 Ajeet Rai
 Kiranpal Pannu
 Isaac Becroft
 Michael Venus (Doubles player)
 Artem Sitak (Doubles player)

Former players
Players who have competed in at least 10 ties.

 Marcus Daniell
 Kelly Evernden
 Brian Fairlie
 Lew Gerrard
 James Greenhalgh
 Alistair Hunt
 Daniel King-Turner
 Chris Lewis
 Mark Nielsen
 Onny Parun
 Russell Simpson
 Artem Sitak
 Jose Statham
 Brett Steven
 Michael Venus

See also
Davis Cup
New Zealand Fed Cup team

External links

Davis Cup teams
Davis Cup
Davis Cup